Domanovo is a rural locality (a village) in Kubenskoye Rural Settlement, Vologodsky District, Vologda Oblast, Russia. The population was 24 as of 2002.

Geography 
Domanovo is located 68 km northwest of Vologda (the district's administrative centre) by road. Viktovo is the nearest rural locality.

References 

Rural localities in Vologodsky District